Austin Kleba (born July 27, 1999) is an American speed skater who represented the United States at the 2022 Winter Olympics.

Career
Kleba represented the United States at the 2016 Winter Youth Olympics, where he won a silver medal in the mixed team sprint. He competed at the 2022 Four Continents Speed Skating Championships and won gold in the 500 metre, team sprint, and a silver medal in the 1000 metre. He represented the United States at the 2022 Winter Olympics.

References

1999 births
Living people
American male speed skaters
Speed skaters at the 2016 Winter Youth Olympics
Youth Olympic silver medalists for the United States
Olympic speed skaters of the United States
Speed skaters at the 2022 Winter Olympics
21st-century American people